The 1878 Michigan gubernatorial election was held on November 5, 1878. Incumbent Republican Charles Croswell defeated Democratic nominee Orlando M. Barnes with 44.66% of the vote.

General election

Candidates
Major party candidates
Charles Croswell, Republican
Orlando M. Barnes, Democratic
Other candidates
Henry S. Smith, Greenback
Watson Snyder, Prohibition

Results

References

1878
Michigan
Gubernatorial
November 1878 events